Michael Green was an African American man who was lynched by a band of masked men near Upper Marlboro, Maryland on  September 1, 1878.

Green was arrested for assaulting Miss Alice Sweeny on August 26, 1878, and held at the jail in Upper Marlboro.  Threats of lynching were openly made and were held off by the vigilance of Sheriff James N.W. Wilson.  After several days, a band of masked men removed Green from the jail, placed a noose around his neck and hung him 15 feet in the air from a tree outside of town.  His body remained dangling from the tree and was observed the next morning.

External links
Resources relating to Michael Green at the Maryland State Archives

References

1878 deaths
1878 in Maryland
African-American history of Prince George's County, Maryland
Lynching deaths in Maryland
Racially motivated violence against African Americans
Prince George's County, Maryland
September 1878 events
1878 murders in the United States